Rodolphe Modin (born 26 March 1959 in Gennevilliers, Paris) is a former French international rugby union player. He played as a scrum-half.

As a youth, he played for CSM Gennevilliers and Racing Métro, with whom he won the under-19 national championship against a Biarritz Olympique team that included Serge Blanco. The following year he joined CA Brive as a senior player, where he made 213 appearances from 1978 to 1991.

Despite being selected for several touring parties of the France team, he made only one appearance, against Zimbabwe at the 1987 World Cup. He started the match and scored a hat-trick as France won 70–12.

Although he has a teaching degree in physical education, he has never taught. After his rugby-playing days were over he began a business career.

References

External links
Scrum profile

1959 births
Living people
People from Gennevilliers
French rugby union players
Racing 92 players
CA Brive players
Rugby union scrum-halves
France international rugby union players
Sportspeople from Hauts-de-Seine